Portea fosteriana is a plant species in the genus Portea.

The bromeliad is endemic to the Atlantic Forest biome (Mata Atlantica Brasileira) and to Espírito Santo, located in southeastern Brazil.

References

fosteriana
Endemic flora of Brazil
Flora of Espírito Santo
Flora of the Atlantic Forest